The first Battle of Hysiae was fought in either 669 or 668 BCE at or near Hysiae, Argolis, during the rule of the Argive tyrant Pheidon. It is referenced by Pausanias (2.24.6) as a victory by the army of Argos over that of Sparta. Nothing else is known about the conflict except that the location in Argolis suggests the repulse by Argos of a Spartan invasion. Hysiae was a stronghold located to the south-west of Argos and east of Tegea, near the border with Sparta. The battle marked a turning point in military history as it caused the Spartans to adopt the phalanx of hoplites in place of the loose spear-throwing formations prevalent until then. The phalanx was to revolutionise warfare.

Battle

Conventional warfare during this time period would involve the two armies meeting in an open field. The Argives apparently chose the city of Hysiae for reasons still unknown. By this time, the aspis, a shield designed by the city of Argos, was already equipped with the Argive army, giving the Argive army another advantage over the Spartan army. It is presumed that the battle ensued inside the city of Argos, where the Spartan army was packed by the proto-phalanx invented perhaps by Pheidon, and where the army perished.

Sources
This was the first Battle of Hysiae, not to be confused the second battle nearly 2 centuries later in 417 BCE. It is described by the ancient travel-writer Pausanias (2.24.7), who writes as follows

The chronology of Pausanias would suggest that the battle was fought in 669/8 BCE.  All that is known is that the Argives defeated the Lacedaemonians.  Some (Andrewes) have suggested that this Argive defeat of Sparta occurred when Pheidon was king (or tyrant) of Argos, since Pheidon was famed for his military success and daring, but this remains conjectural. Some scholars (Kelly, Hall) have suggested that the first battle of Hysiae was invented by the Argives.

References

Sources
 A. Andrewes (1956), The Greek Tyrants
 Jonathan M. Hall (2007), A History of the Archaic Greek World, ca. 1200–479 BCE, pp. 145–154
 T. Kelly, "Did the Argives defeat the Spartans at Hysiai in 669 BCE?" American Journal of Philology 91 (1970) 31–42. 
 R. Stillwell et al. (eds.), The Princeton Encyclopedia of Classical Sites (Princeton, 1976) 

Hysiae
Hysiae
Hysiae